FC Lelle is an amateur football club in Lelle, Estonia.

It is not to be confused with Lelle SK, a former club in the same town, which was renamed as JK Tervis Pärnu.

External links
Club website
FC Lelle at WorldFootball.net
FC Lelle at Estonian Football Asasaociation

Lelle
Kehtna Parish